The 1999–2000 Four Hills Tournament took place at the four traditional venues of Oberstdorf, Garmisch-Partenkirchen, Innsbruck and Bischofshofen, located in Germany and Austria, between 29 December 1999 and 6 January 2000.

Results

Overall

References

External links 
 Official website 

Four Hills Tournament
1999 in ski jumping
2000 in ski jumping
1999 in German sport
2000 in German sport
2000 in Austrian sport